Ripuarian may refer to:

 Ripuarian Franks, a subset of Frankish people who lived in the Rhineland
 Ripuarian language, a West Central German dialect group
 Riparian water rights (or simply riparian rights) a system for allocating water among those who possess land along its path
 Riparian zone (or riparian area), the interface between land and a river or stream
 Riparian-zone restoration, the ecological restoration of riparian zone habitats of streams, rivers, springs, lakes, floodplains, and other hydrologic ecologies

See also 
 London Stone (riparian), the name given to a number of boundary stones which stand beside the rivers Thames and Medway, which formerly marked the limits of jurisdiction of the City of London